Douglas Wylie (born 20 May 1963) is a former Scotland international rugby union player and now coach.

Rugby Union career

Amateur career

Wylie was born in Edinburgh.  He captained Stewart's Melville in 1994.

Provincial career

He played for Edinburgh District in the Scottish Inter-District Championship.

He played for Combined Scottish Districts on 1 March 1986 against South of Scotland.

International career

He was capped by Scotland 'B' three times in the seasons between 1984 and 1985.

He was capped by Scotland 'A' six times in the seasons between 1990 and 1993.

He had his full senior international debut, age 21, as fly-half against Australia at Murrayfield on 8 December 1984. He went on tour with Scotland on all but one of the ten that they made since 1984. Some tours, such as the 1988 Scotland rugby union tour of Zimbabwe didn’t award full caps. His last international was against France on 19 March 1994.

He won 18 international caps.

Coaching career

He coached in New Zealand, then coached Kirkcaldy RFC in 2001.

References

1963 births
Living people
Rugby union players from Edinburgh
Scottish rugby union players
Scotland international rugby union players
Scotland 'B' international rugby union players
Scotland 'A' international rugby union players
Edinburgh District (rugby union) players
Stewart's Melville RFC players
Rugby union centres
Scottish Districts (combined) players